Lara avara is a species of riffle beetle in the family Elmidae. It is found in North America.

Subspecies
These two subspecies belong to the species Lara avara:
 Lara avara amplipennis Darlington, 1929
 Lara avara avara LeConte, 1852

References

Further reading

 
 

Elmidae
Articles created by Qbugbot
Beetles described in 1852